Andre Damian Williams Jr (born 1980) is an American lawyer who is the United States attorney for the Southern District of New York. He is the first African-American U.S. attorney for the Southern District of New York.

Early life and education 

Williams was born in Brooklyn, New York City and raised in the Atlanta metropolitan area, the son of Jamaican immigrants. His parents are divorced. He attended Woodward Academy for high school where he was student body president in his final year. He received a Bachelor of Arts in economics from Harvard University in 2002 and a Master of Philosophy in international relations from the Emmanuel College, Cambridge in 2003. Afterward, Williams worked for John Kerry's 2004 presidential campaign in Cedar Rapids, Iowa, and South Carolina and as a "body man" for the chairman of the Democratic National Committee, Terry McAuliffe. He then enrolled at Yale Law School. Following his first year of law school, Williams clerked for the office of United States Attorney for the Southern District of New York. He obtained a Juris Doctor from Yale in 2007, where he was supported by The Paul & Daisy Soros Fellowships for New Americans and was also an editor of the Yale Law Journal. One of his essays about improving voting rights after Hurricane Katrina was published in the Yale Law Journal in 2007.

Career 

Williams began his legal career as a law clerk to Judge Merrick Garland of the United States Court of Appeals for the District of Columbia Circuit from 2007 to 2008. He then served as a law clerk for Justice John Paul Stevens of the United States Supreme Court from 2008 to 2009. From 2009 to 2012, he was a litigation associate at Paul, Weiss, Rifkind, Wharton & Garrison. From 2012 to 2021, he served as an assistant United States attorney in the United States Attorney's Office for the Southern District of New York. In the role, he served as a chief of the securities and commodities fraud task force from 2018 to 2021.

In 2018, Williams helped secure the conviction of Sheldon Silver, the former speaker of the New York State Assembly.

U.S. attorney for the Southern District of New York 

In March 2021, Senate Majority Leader Chuck Schumer recommended Williams to be the next U.S. attorney for the Southern District of New York. On August 10, 2021, President Joe Biden nominated Williams to serve in the role.

On September 30, 2021, his nomination was reported out of committee by voice vote. On October 5, 2021, Williams was confirmed in the Senate by voice vote. He became the first African-American U.S. attorney for the Southern District of New York and, as of October 2021, was one of seven African-Americans among 232 assistant U.S. attorneys and executives in the district. He was sworn into office on October 10, 2021. Upon his confirmation, Williams was slated to oversee cases including the trial of Jeffrey Epstein associate Ghislaine Maxwell and the case of Sayfullo Habibullaevic Saipov, who was charged with committing the 2017 New York City truck attack.

Williams oversaw the indictment of Lieutenant Governor Brian Benjamin, who resigned after being arrested on federal bribery charges. 

On December 13, 2022, his office indicted Sam Bankman-Fried (SBF), ex-CEO of FTX, on eight counts of fraud and conspiracy.

On January 6, 2023, his office announced that Real Housewives of Salt Lake City star Jennifer Shah was sentenced by United States District Judge Sidney H. Stein to 78 months in prison for running a nationwide telemarketing fraud scheme. Shah previously pled guilty to one count of conspiracy to commit wire fraud in connection with telemarketing.

Personal life 

The Williams family is from Frome, a sugar producing region in Westmoreland, Jamaica. Williams married academic and fellow Harvard graduate, Jennifer Wynn, in 2012 in Manhattan, five years after they met on a bus trip from Washington to New York.

See also 
 List of law clerks of the Supreme Court of the United States (Seat 4)

References

1980 births
Living people
21st-century African-American people
21st-century American lawyers
African-American lawyers
Alumni of Emmanuel College, Cambridge
Assistant United States Attorneys
Harvard College alumni
Law clerks of the Supreme Court of the United States
Lawyers from Brooklyn
New York (state) lawyers
United States Attorneys for the Southern District of New York
Yale Law School alumni
20th-century African-American people